Rocester is a civil parish in the district of East Staffordshire, Staffordshire, England.  It contains 15 buildings that are recorded in the National Heritage List for England.  Of these, two are listed at Grade II*, the middle grade, and the others are at Grade II, the lowest grade.  The parish contains the village of Rocester and the surrounding area.  The listed buildings include houses and associated structures, cottages, a church and a cross in the churchyard, a farmhouse, a former public house, a former cotton mill, two mills, two bridges and a causeway.


Key

Buildings

Notes and references

Notes

Citations

Sources

Lists of listed buildings in Staffordshire